The Presbyterian Church in Korea (HoHun III) is a Reformed Presbyterian denomination in South Korea. It adheres to the Apostles Creed and Westminster Confession. In 2004 it had 51,481 members in 310 congregations and 309 ordained clergy.

References 

Presbyterian denominations in South Korea
Presbyterian denominations in Asia